NGC 5966 is an elliptical galaxy in the constellation Boötes. NGC 5966 is its New General Catalogue designation. The galaxy was discovered by William Herschel on March 18, 1787. Based on its redshift, it is located about 220 million light-years (67 Mpc) away from the Sun.

References

External links 
 

Boötes
5966
Elliptical galaxies